Len Sell (born 3 February 1935) is an English professional bodybuilder who was prominent in the late 1950s and early 1960s. He won two Mr. Universe titles – amateur in 1959, and professional in 1962.

References

1935 births
English bodybuilders
Living people
People associated with physical culture
Professional bodybuilders